The Episcopal Diocese of Northwest Texas is one of the Dioceses of the Episcopal Church in the United States of America. It is in Province 7. The diocese is based in Lubbock, Texas.

History
The Missionary District of North Texas was created in 1910 by the General Convention. It incorporated territories previously part of the Diocese of Dallas and the Diocese of West Texas. In 1958, the Missionary District of North Texas was established as the Diocese of Northwest Texas. The diocese has no cathedral.

Bishops
Missionary District of Northern Texas
 Edward Arthur Temple, 1910-1924
 Eugene Cecil Seaman, 1925-1945
 George H. Quarterman, 1946-1958

Diocese of Northwest Texas 
 George H. Quarterman, 1958-1972
 Willis Ryan Henton, 1972-1980
 Sam Byron Hulsey, 1980-1997
 Charles Wallis Ohl, 1997-2008
 James Scott Mayer, 2009–present

References

External links
Episcopal Diocese of Northwest Texas

Northwest Texas, Episcopal Diocese of
Episcopal Church in Texas
Organizations based in Lubbock, Texas
Province 7 of the Episcopal Church (United States)